River Valley Community School District is a rural public school district headquartered in Correctionville, Iowa. It includes sections of Cherokee, Ida, and Woodbury counties. It serves Correctionville, Cushing, Quimby, and Washta.

History

It was established on July 1, 1996, by the merger of the Eastwood Community School District and the Willow Community School District.

Schools
 River Valley Junior/Senior High School
 River Valley Elementary School

Previously it was divided into River Valley Elementary, River Valley Middle, and River Valley High.

River Valley High School

Athletics
The Wolverines compete in the Western Valley Activities Conference in the following sports:
Cross Country
Volleyball
Football
Basketball
Track and Field
Golf
Baseball
Softball

See also
List of school districts in Iowa
List of high schools in Iowa

References

External links
 River Valley Community School District
 
  (for 1998–1999)

School districts in Iowa
1996 establishments in Iowa
School districts established in 1996
Education in Cherokee County, Iowa
Education in Ida County, Iowa
Education in Woodbury County, Iowa